Argiris Papapetrou (alternate spellings: Argirios, Argyris, Argyrios) (born February 21, 1965) is a retired Greek professional basketball player and coach. At 6'9" (2.06 m) in height, he played at the power forward and center positions.

Professional career
Papapetrou started his playing career with Pierikos. In 1985, he moved to Panathinaikos, and with them, he won the Greek Cup title in 1986 and 1993. In 1994, he moved to Apollon Patras, and in 1996, he joined Irakleio.

National team career
Papapetrou was a member of the senior men's Greek national team. He played with Greece at the 1984 FIBA European Olympic Qualifying Tournament and the 1994 FIBA World Championship. He also played with Greece at the Balkan Championship in 1985 and 1990.

Coaching career
After the end of his playing career, Papapetrou worked as a basketball coach. He was the head coach of Panathinaikos Women, during the 2005–06 season.

Personal life
Papapetrou's sons, Ioannis Papapetrou and Georgios Papapetrou, are also professional basketball players.

External links
FIBA Profile
FIBA Europe Profile
Hellenic Federation Profile 

1965 births
1994 FIBA World Championship players
Apollon Patras B.C. players
Centers (basketball)
Greek basketball coaches
Greek Basket League players
Greek men's basketball players
Irakleio B.C. players
Living people
Panathinaikos B.C. players
People from Pieria (regional unit)
Power forwards (basketball)
Sportspeople from Central Macedonia